Quickbase, Inc., is a software company that provides a low-code application development platform. The company is headquartered in Boston, Massachusetts, and was spun off from Intuit in March 2016. In January 2019, Vista Equity Partners, a private equity firm, announced that it had acquired a majority stake in Quickbase from Welsh, Carson, Anderson & Stowe for a reported $1 billion. 

Quickbase offers a platform that enables users to build custom applications without the need for extensive coding knowledge. The company's platform provides a range of features, Including drag-and-drop functionality, customizable templates, and pre-built components. These features allow users to build and deploy applications quickly and efficiently, saving time and resources.

History
In 1999, Joe Rice, Jim Salem, and Claude von Roesgen developed OneBase, a web-based multi-tenant architecture based database service to enable consolidation and sharing of easily accessible business information. In fall of 1999, Intuit added OneBase to its product portfolio, which includes QuickBooks and TurboTax. In 2000, Intuit renamed OneBase and launched Quickbase, described at the time as a "web-based tool for sharing information that will revolutionize how small businesses and workgroups collaborate with employees, vendors and customers".

In 2005, Quickbase was chosen as PC Magazine Editors' Choice. The same year, Quickbase won the SIIA Codie Award for "Best Business Software Product or Service." In 2015, Intuit announced plans to divest itself from Demandforce, Quickbase, and Quicken operations. Quickbase won the SIIA CODiE Award for Best Real Estate/Construction Management Solution and finalist for Best Cloud Platform as a Service.

In 2016, Welsh, Carson, Anderson & Stowe completed its acquisition of Intuit Quickbase. In January 2019, Vista Equity Partners purchased majority equity in the company for more than $1B. Welsh, Carson, Anderson & Stowe remained a minority stakeholder. In August, Quickbase bought Cloudpipes, which provides integration and automation tools for business applications through a cloud-based platform.

Services
Quickbase is a low-code platform that allows non-technical developers to build, customize and connect secure cloud applications without compromising IT governance and control.

References

External links 
 Quickbase, Inc. website

1999 establishments in Massachusetts
Companies based in Cambridge, Massachusetts
Software companies established in 1999
American companies established in 1999
Software companies based in Massachusetts
Software companies of the United States
2019 mergers and acquisitions
Private equity portfolio companies
Business software companies